Besto Mondo is a compilation album by Australian rock band Mondo Rock, released in August 2015 by Aztec Music. The album includes remastered versions of the band's hits. Upon release, band member Ross Wilson said "We start the compilation with "Come Said the Boy" of course, because that's become our biggest perennial, but you can play this record all the way through and it holds your attention. You hear one song and then another one comes along and grabs you, rather than it sounds the same, so I've tried to programme it so it flows really well."

The album was promoted with a national Besto Mondo tour.

In an interview with Weekend Notes, band member Paul Christie said "We toured in 2014 for the first time in 24 years, with the original line up and played to sold out shows around the country to rave reviews. We are getting a whole new generation of fans coming to the concerts and having that same emotional connection, largely due to the Mondo Rock songs being constantly played on the radio."

Track listing

Release history

References 

2015 compilation albums
Mondo Rock albums
Compilation albums by Australian artists
Albums produced by John L Sayers
Albums produced by Waddy Wachtel